Binge or Binges may refer to:

Behavior
Binge, a behavior engaged in excessively over a short period of time, such as:
 Binge drinking
 Binge eating
 Binge-watching

Arts, entertainment, and media
 Binge (EP), a 2018 EP by Machine Gun Kelly
 Binge (streaming service), an Australian streaming service owned by Foxtel
 Binge, a live TV & video streaming service by Robi Axiata
 Binge (TV channel), a former Australian cable television channel
 "Binge", a song from the Papa Roach album Infest
 Binge Records, an indie rock record label
 The Binge, a 2020 American comedy film

People
 Caleb Binge (born 1993), Australian rugby league footballer
 Dagmar Anita Binge, German founder of Binge Discs (country music specialists)
 Ronald Binge (1910–1979), British composer and arranger of light music

Other uses
 Binge (mining), a depression in the terrain caused by mining activity
 Binges, Côte-d'Or, a commune in eastern France

See also
 Bing (disambiguation)
 Bingen (disambiguation)
 Binger, a surname